The political history of Pakistan is the narrative and analysis of political events, ideas, movements, and leaders of Pakistan. Pakistan gained independence from the United Kingdom on 14 August 1947, when the Presidencies and provinces of British India were divided by the United Kingdom, in a region which is commonly referred to as the Indian subcontinent. Since its independence, Pakistan has had a colorful yet turbulent political history at times, often characterized by martial law and inefficient leadership.

Pre-independence era 
The Pakistan Movement, as it came to be known, was based on the principle of two-nation theory, and aimed to establish a separate homeland for Muslims in South Asia. This was a movement against the oppression, that Muslims felt in the face of an increasingly politicized Hindu majority. The Pakistan Movement was spearheaded by Muhammad Ali Jinnah and staunchly opposed by some of Muslim religious scholars.

Parliamentary democracy
After the independence, Liaquat Ali Khan became the first prime minister and Jinnah became the first Governor-General. Pakistan consisted of two wings, West-Pakistan and East-Pakistan. The Liaquat government, along with all subsequent governments during that first decade after independence faced serious difficulties in effectively governing both East and West Pakistan, eventually leading to the military coup of 1958.   The Indo-Pakistani War of 1947 began to take place in Kashmir region in 1947. Both Liaquat and Jinnah were determined to stop the riots and refugee problems and to set up an effective administrative system for the country. Liaquat Ali Khan did the groundbreaking work for the Foreign Policy of Pakistan while taking initiatives towards the formulation of the constitution. He presented the Objectives Resolution, a prelude to future constitutions, in the Legislative Assembly. The house passed it on 12 March 1949. It has been described as the "Magna Carta" of Pakistan's constitutional history. Both United States and Soviet Union sent invitation to Liaquat Ali Khan. However, Khan chose to pay a goodwill visit to United States first. This was perceived as a rebuff to Moscow, and has been traced to profound adverse consequences. Khan had wanted Pakistan to remain neutral in the Cold War, as declared three days after Pakistan's independence when he declared that Pakistan would take no sides in the conflict of ideologies between the nations. Khan later tried to visit Soviet Union but the dates for goodwill visit were not materialized by Soviet Union.

The same year, Jinnah declared Urdu as official language of Pakistan. It sparked protests in East Pakistan (formerly East Bengal), where Bengali was spoken by most of the population. Jinnah also faced problems with Pakistan Army's Commander-in-Chief General Sir Douglas Gracey who refused to obey the orders of Jinnah. General Gracey argued that Jinnah as Governor-General represented the British Crown of which he himself was an appointee. Therefore, he did not send troops to Kashmir region. Jinnah also faced problems with Commander-in-Chief of the Air Force Air Vice-Marshal Richard Atcherley and Commander-in-Chief of the Navy Rear Admiral James Wilfred Jefford who also refused to obey standing orders given by Jinnah.

During Khan's tenure, India and Pakistan agreed to resolve the dispute of Kashmir in a peaceful manner through the efforts of the United Nations. This agreement was termed as 'Karachi Agreement' and a ceasefire was effected in Kashmir on January 1, 1949. It was decided that a free and impartial plebiscite would be held under the supervision of the UN.

In 1948, Jinnah died, and a major problem of religious minorities flared during late 1949 and early 1950. Militants from Jamiat Ulema-e-Pakistan began to attack the minorities in West-Pakistan, which later slipped to India. Sensing another war with India, Khan met Indian Prime Minister Jawaharlal Nehru to sign the Liaquat-Nehru Pact in 1950. The pact was an effort to improve relations and reduce tension between India and Pakistan, and to protect the religious minorities on both sides of the borders.

In East Pakistan, the Bengali Language Movement reached its peak on 21 February 1952, when the police and soldiers opened fire on students near the Dhaka Medical College protesting for Bengali to receive equal status with Urdu. Several protesters were killed, and the movement gained further support throughout East Pakistan. Later, the Government agreed to provide equal status to Bengali as a state language of Pakistan, a right later codified in the 1956 constitution.

1951 attempted coup d'état (coup) 

In 1951, the Military Intelligence (MI) director-general Major-General Syed Shahid Hamid foiled an attempted coup d'état, planned by Major-General Akbar Khan, then Chief of General's Staff of the Generals Headquarter (GHQ) was arrested along with a number of officers from Pakistan Army. It was the first conspiracy against the elected government. Eleven military (army) officers and four civilians were involved in the conspiracy. The conspirator included Faiz Ahmad Faiz, a notable poet and intellectual, also connected with the Communist Party of Pakistan. In the meantime, Commander-in-Chief of Pakistan Army General Ayub Khan and Defense minister Iskandar Mirza remained loyal to Liaquat Ali Khan. After an 18-month trial conducted in secrecy, Major-General Khan and Faiz Ahmed Faiz were both convicted and sentenced to long terms of imprisonment. Their defense lawyer was the notable Bengali Muslim politician Huseyn Shaheed Suhrawardy. When Suhrawardy became the Prime Minister of Pakistan in 1957, he obtained a reprieve for most of the conspirators.

The 1958 era: the first martial law

The government in response to the riots eventually asked the military for help and in response Corp Commander of Lahore General Muhammad Azam Khan enacted the first martial law in parts of the country.

This was a turning point in the country's history and even though the riots were eventually quashed by force but the seeds of intolerance were sown in the Pakistani society, and only got stronger over time.

1965 War 

In 1962, Pakistan had witnessed the Sino-Indian War, with neither side gaining victory over other side.

The Inter-Services Intelligence's Joint Intelligence North and Military Intelligence's Northern Areas Assessment directorate began to formulate the plan to infiltrate in Kashmir. In 1965, assuming that a weakened Indian Military would not respond, Pakistan chose to send in "mujahideens" and Pakistan Army regulars into the Indian-controlled part of Jammu and Kashmir. Zulfikar Ali Bhutto backed the plan, and Pakistan Army's SS Group was told to begin an operation, under codename Operation Gibraltar. However, even after the careful analysis the airborne operation failed, and major war broke out between India and Pakistan. Ayub Khan blamed Bhutto for starting the conflict, while the armed forces became increasingly involved in the war.

However, both Soviet-Union and United States deescalated the conflict. China provided economic and moral help and even threatened India on its conflicted border issues.  Khan along with Lal Bahadur Shastri signed the Tashkent Declaration.

1970 Pakistan election 

After the indecisive war of 1965 with India, Pakistani people began to accuse Field Marshal Ayub Khan of betraying the cause of Kashmir. Months after the war, Munir Ahmad Khan, a nuclear engineer at IAEA's Reactor Division, met Bhutto where he notified Bhutto with rapid development of Indian nuclear programme. Sensing the seriousness of such threat, Bhutto arranged a meeting between Munir Ahmad Khan and Ayub Khan at The Dorchester in London. Khan urged the need of acceleration of nuclear energy programme and develop a credible nuclear deterrent capability. Ayub Khan refused accelerating the programme, and famously said: if we [Pakistan] ever need the [atom] bomb, we [Pakistan] will buy it off the shelf". Munir Ahmad Khan quickly notified Bhutto of what had happened. And, Bhutto began lobbying for the nuclear weapon's option. However, due to economical reasons, Khan deferred and refused to expand the nuclear energy programme despite the proposals made by Bhutto, Abdul Salam and Munir Khan. With extensive efforts led by Abdus Salam, Khan had personally approved the KANUPP-I commercial plant, against the wishes of his own military government.

In 1966, Ayub Khan removed Bhutto as his Foreign minister, in a conspiracy planned by Jurist and then-Bhutto's secretary Mushtaq Hussain, and under pressured by the Lyndon Johnson, President of the United States that time. In 1967, Bhutto formed People's Party of Pakistan and tapped a wave of anti-Ayub Khan movement in both West and East Pakistan. Demoralized and pressured, Ayub Khan handed over the regime to his junior Commander-in-Chief of Pakistan Army General Yahya Khan in 1969. General Yahya designated himself as Chief Martial Law Administrator of the country and installed a military government in both East and West-Pakistan. Yahya and his military government promised to hold a general election within 2 years.

The General parliamentary elections were held  in 1970, with People's Party winning the majority in West-Pakistan and Awami League [People's League] gaining absolute majority in East-Pakistan. Yahya Khan, Chief Martial Law Administrator of Pakistan, held talks with both Zulfikar Ali Bhutto and Sheikh Mujibur Rehman. Negotiation and talks were brutally failed, and Bhutto was famously heard saying "break the legs" if any member of [People's Party] attend the National Assembly inaugural session. However, the capitalization on West-Pakistan, West-Pakistanis feared the East-Pakistani separatism, therefore, Bhutto demanded a coalition government with Mujib. In a meeting, both Mujib and Bhutto agreed upon a coalition government as Bhutto would assumed the Presidency and Mujib as Premier. The Military government and General Yahya Khan was kept unaware of such of these developments. Both Bhutto and Mujib continued a political pressure on Khan's military government. Under pressured by Bhutto, Mujib and his military government, General Khan ordered a military action in East Pakistan. The Military Police arrested Bhutto and put him on house arrest. And, Mujib was sent to military court where his case was headed by Judge Advocate General Branch's Brigadier-General Rahimuddin Khan.

General Khan ordered Vice-Admiral Mohammad Shariff, Commander of Eastern Naval Command of the Pakistan Navy and Lieutenant-General Amir Abdullah Khan Niazi, Commander of the Eastern Military Command of Pakistan Army, an extreme armed action to curb and liberate the East-Pakistan from the resistance. Faced with popular unrest and revolt in East-Pakistan, the Army and Navy clamped down through violence. The navy and army crackdown and brutalities during the Operation Searchlight and Operation Barisal and the continued extrajudicial killings throughout the later months resulted in further resentment among the East Pakistanis of East Pakistan. With India assisting the Mukti Bahini, war broke out between the separatist supporters in Bangladesh and Pakistan (Indo-Pakistani War of 1971).organizations like "Al-Badar" and "Al-Shams" were made by Jammat-e-Islami to support Pakistan and Pakistan Army during the conflict, the coordination between the armed forces of Pakistan were ineffective and unsupported. On major decision, the army, navy, marine and air force weren't taken in confidence. Each force had led their own independent operations without notifying or taking in confidence the higher command.

The result was the Pakistan Armed Forces surrender to the Indian forces upon which 93,000 Pakistan Armed Forces officials and 93,000 soldiers and officers became POWs, the largest since World War II. The official war between India and Pakistan ended in just a fortnight on December 16, 1971, with Pakistan losing East Pakistan, which became Bangladesh. 

During this alleged mass killing in Bangladesh (so called East-Pakistan), the military government had refused to take any political and reconciliation initiatives despite the calls were made. The coordination between the armed forces were ineffective and unsupported. The Air Force was brutally failed to protect the naval and army assets during the conflict (See Operation Python and Operation Trident).

Return of democracy

Soon after Bhutto assumed the control of the country, Bhutto released Mujibur Rehman, and put General Khan on house arrest instead. Bhutto, immediately appeared on PTV where addressed an emotional speech to his shattered nation. Bhutto also formed the Hamoodur Rahman Commission, to carry out the inquiry and causes of the war, under the Bengali Chief Justice Hamoodur Rahman. Bhutto fired Commander-in-Chief of Pakistan Army, Lieutenant-General Gul Hassan Khan and also deposed Air Marshal Abdul Rahim Khan, Commander-in-Chief of Pakistan Air Force, and Vice-Admiral Muzaffar Hassan, then-Commander-in-Chief of Pakistan Navy. All of these Commander-in-Chiefs led their services during the conflict, and openly blamed each other for their intense failure.

Bhutto also disbanded the Pakistan Marines, a new service in the navy, after failing to produce any effective results during the conflict. Bhutto sought to re-organized the Military of Pakistan and numerous officers who were responsible for Bengal's autocracies were fired from their services. In July 1972, Bhutto traveled to India to meet the Indian Premier Indira Gandhi where he successfully proceeded the Shimla Agreement, and brought back 93,000 Pakistan Armed Forces personnel, secured 5,000 mile sq area held by India. Under this agreement, Bhutto recognized East-Pakistan as Bangladesh.

Bhutto also disapproved the capitalist policies of Field Marshal Ayub Khan, and instead introduced the socialist economics policies while working to prevent any further division of the country. On 2 January 1972, Bhutto announced the nationalization of all major industries, including iron and steel, heavy engineering, heavy electrical engineering, petrochemicals, cement and public utilities. A new labor policy was announced with more workers rights and the power of trade unions.

In 1974, Parliament of Pakistan gave approval of 1973 Constitution. For the first time after 1958, the country was shifted back to parliamentary democracy with Bhutto as Prime minister of the country. In 1974, Bhutto adopted the recommendation from Hamoodur Rehman Commission, and disbanded the "Commander-in-Chief" title as the head of the Pakistan Armed Forces. Bhutto appointed Chiefs of Staff in Pakistan Armed Forces, reporting directly to the Prime minister. General Tikka Khan, infamous for his role in Bangladesh war, was made the first Chief of Army Staff of Pakistan Army; Admiral Mohammad Shariff was made the first 4-star admiral, and first Chief of Naval Staff of Pakistan Navy, and Air Chief Marshal Zulfikar Ali Khan as first 4-star air force general and Chief of Air Staff of Pakistan Air Force. In 1976, Bhutto also created the office of Joint Chiefs of Staff Committee, and the chairmanship of this important and prestigious tier was given to General Muhammad Sharif, who was also promoted to 4-star rank. The Joint Chiefs of Staff Committee was formed after the careful analysis of Pakistan Armed Forces, and it is the principal body that maintain coordination between the armed forces.

Nuclear deterrent development

Since 1967, Bhutto had been lobbying for the option for nuclear deterrence on different occasions. Soon after Bhutto came to assume control of Pakistan, he made his move to establish the nuclear weapons development. On January 20, 1972, Abdus Salam, after being requested by Zulfikar Ali Bhutto, arranged and managed a secret meeting of academic scientists and engineers, in Multan city, to meet with Zulfikar Ali Bhutto who assumed the control of his country shortly after the Indo-Pakistani war of 1971 and the Bangladesh Liberation War. It was here that Bhutto orchestrated, administrated, and led the scientific research on nuclear weapons as he announced the official nuclear weapons development programme. In 1972, Pakistan's core intelligence service, the ISI, secretly learned that India was close to developing an atomic bomb, under its (India) nuclear programme. Partially in response, defence expenditure and funding of science under then-Prime minister Zulfikar Ali Bhutto increased by 200%. In the initial years and starting years, Dr. Abdus Salam, a Nobel laureate, headed the nuclear weapons program as he was the Science adviser to the prime minister. He is also credited in bringing hundreds of Pakistani scientists, engineers, and mathematicians who would later go on to develop the nuclear weapons program and later on formed and headed "Theoretical Physics Group" (TPG), the special weapons division of Pakistan Atomic Energy Commission (PAEC) that developed the designs and completed the crucial mathematical and physics calculations of the nuclear weapons.

Throughout the time, the foundations were laid down to develop a military nuclear capability. This includes the nuclear fuel cycle and nuclear weapons design, development and testing programme. The fuel cycle program included the uranium exploration, mining, refining, conversion and Uranium Hexafluoride (UF6) production, enrichment and fuel fabrication and reprocessing facilities. These facilities were established in the Pakistan Atomic Energy Commission or PAEC by its Chairman Munir Ahmad Khan. He was appointed as chairman of Pakistan Atomic Energy Commission (PAEC) on January 20, 1972, at the Multan Conference of senior scientists and engineers. Earlier, Munir Ahmad Khan was serving as Director of Nuclear Power and Reactors Division, IAEA. He was credited to be the "technical father" of Pakistan's atom project by a recent International Institute of Strategic Studies, London, (IISS) Dossier on history of the Pakistan's nuclear development, with Zulfikar Ali Bhutto as the father of Pakistan's nuclear developmental programme. Munir Ahmad Khan, an expert in Plutonium technology, had also laid the foundation and groundbreaking work for the Plutonium reprocessing technology. Khan, built the New Laboratories, a plutonium reprocessing plant located in Islamabad.

After Chief Martial Law Administrator (later president) and Chief of Army Staff General Zia-ul-Haq came to power (see Operation Fair Play), further advancements were made to enrich uranium and consolidate the nuclear development programme. On March 11, 1983, PAEC led by Munir Ahmad Khan carried out the first successful cold test of a working nuclear device near at the Kirana Hills under codename Kirana-I. The test was led by CERN-physicist Dr. Ishfaq Ahmad, and was witnessed by other senior scientists belonging to Pakistan Armed Forces and the PAEC. To compound further matters, the Soviet Union had withdrawn from Afghanistan and the strategic importance of Pakistan to the United States was gone. Once the full extent of Pakistan's nuclear weapons development was revealed, economic sanctions (see Pressler amendment) were imposed on the country by several other countries, particularly United States. Having been developed under both Bhutto and Zia, the nuclear development programme had fully matured by the late 1980s. Dr. Abdul Qadeer Khan, a metallurgical engineer, greatly contributed to the uranium enrichment programme under both governments. Dr. A. Q. Khan established an administrative proliferation network through Dubai to smuggle URENCO nuclear technology to Khan Research Laboratories. He then established Pakistan's gas-centrifuge program based on the URENCO's Zippe-type centrifuge. Dr. Abdul Qadeer Khan is considered to be the founder of Pakistan's HEU based gas-centrifuge uranium enrichment programme, which was originally launched by PAEC in 1974.

The PAEC also played its part in the success and development of the uranium enrichment programme by producing the uranium hexafluoride gas feedstock for enrichment. PAEC was also responsible for all the pre and post enrichment phases of the nuclear fuel cycle. By 1986 PAEC Chairman Munir Ahmad Khan had begun work on the 50 MW plutonium and tritium production reactor at Khushab, known as Khushab Reactor Complex, which became operational by 1998.

Balochistan civil unrest

The Baloch rebellion of the 1970s was the most threatening civil disorder to a United Pakistan since Bangladesh's secession. The Pakistan Armed Forces wanted to establish military garrisons in Balochistan Province, which at that time was quite lawless and run by tribal justice. The ethnic Balochis saw this as a violation of their territorial rights. Emboldened by the stand taken by Sheikh Mujibur Rahman in 1971, the Baloch and Pashtun nationalists had also demanded their "provincial rights" from then Prime minister Zulfikar Ali Bhutto in exchange for a consensual approval of the Pakistan Constitution of 1973. But while Bhutto admitted the NWFP and Balochistan to a NAP-JUI coalition, he refused to negotiate with the provincial governments led by chief minister Ataullah Mengal in Quetta and Mufti Mahmud in Peshawar. Tensions erupted and an armed resistance began to take place.

Surveying the political instability, Bhutto's central government sacked two provincial governments within six months, arrested the two chief ministers, two governors and forty-four MNAs and MPAs, obtained an order from the Supreme Court banning the NAP and charged them all with high treason, to be tried by a specially constituted Hyderabad Tribunal of handpicked judges.

In time, the Baloch nationalist insurgency erupted and sucked the armed forces into the province, pitting the Baloch tribal middle classes against Islamabad. The sporadic fighting between the insurgency and the army started in 1973 with the largest confrontation taking place in September 1974 when around 15,000 Balochs fought the Pakistani Army, Navy and Air Force. Following the successful recovery of the ammunition in the Iraqi embassy, shipped by both Iraq and Soviet Union for the Baluchistan resistance, the Naval Intelligence launched the investigation, and cited that arms were smuggled from the coastal areas of Balochistan. The Navy acted immediately, and jumped in the conflict. Vice-Admiral Patrick Simpson, commander of Southern Naval Command, began to launch the series of operation with also applying the naval blockage.

The Iranian military fearing a spread of the greater Baloch resistance in Iran also aided the Bhutto-sent Pakistan military in brutally putting down the insurrection.[25] After three days of fighting the Baloch tribals were running out of ammunition and so withdrew by 1976. The army had suffered 25 fatalities and around 300 casualties in the fight while the rebels lost 5,000 people as of 1977.

Although major fighting had broken down, ideological schisms caused splinter groups to form and steadily gain momentum. Despite the overthrow of the Bhutto government in 1977 by General Zia-ul-Haque, Chief of Army Staff of Pakistan Army, calls for secession and widespread civil disobedience remained. The military government then appointed General Rahimuddin Khan as Martial Law Administrator over the Balochistan Province. The provincial military government under the famously authoritarian General Rahimuddin began to act as a separate entity and military regime independent of the central government.

This allowed General Rahimuddin Khan to act as an absolute martial law administrator, unanswerable to the central government. Both General Zia-ul-Haq and General Rahimuddin Khan supported the declaration of a general amnesty in Balochistan to those willing to give up arms. General Rahimuddin then purposefully isolated feudal leaders such as Nawab Akbar Khan Bugti and Ataullah Mengal from provincial policy. He also militarily put down all civil disobedience movements, effectively leading to unprecedented social stability within the province. Due to martial law, his reign was the longest in the history of Balochistan (1977–1984).

Third martial law period
During the 1977 parliamentary elections, the Pakistan National Alliance (PPP) under the renowned theologian  Maulana Maududi began to advocate the overthrow the government of Bhutto. The religious leaders had always seen Bhutto's policies autocratic and more of secular policies than being under in Islamic system. Maududi began to call for Bhutto's overthrow and end his regime as he grabbed support from Pakistan's conservative Islamist parties. Despite of these serious movement, Zulfikar Ali Bhutto held talks with the PNA and Islamist leaders. An agreement was eventually reached in June 1977 and Bhutto was to sign it on July 5. However, in spite the enthusiasm of the negotiating team other PNA leaders had reservations about the agreement. On the other hand, Maududi showed to Army that no agreement was taken place, and Maududi encouraged General Zia-ul-Haq, then-Chief of Army Staff who was recently appointed by Bhutto after Bhutto forced to retire 17 senior generals in order to bring Zia as Chief of Army Staff. Maududi encouraged General Zia-ul-Haq to stage a coup against Bhutto, and convinced him that a new Islamic, but a military coup needed against [B]hutto in order to maintain law and order in the country. Encouraged and supported by Maududi and other hardline religious leaders, General Zia staged a coup against his own loyal supporter [Bhutto] in July 1977 (See Operation Fair Play). Maududi and other hardliner religious groups supported the martial law government, and remained loyal to General Zia entire his regime.

General Zia appointed Mushtaq Hussain, chief jurist for Bhutto's case. Mushtaq Hussain was famously known in the public as extreme hater of Bhutto, and played a controversial role in Bhutto's removal as foreign minister in 1965. Mushtaq Hussain, now judge, disrespected Bhutto and his hometown, and further denied any appeals. Under Zia's direction and Mushtaq's order, Bhutto was controversially executed in 1979 after the Supreme Court upheld the High Court's death sentence on charges of authorizing the murder of a political opponent.[27] Under Zia's martial law military dictatorship (which was declared legal under the Doctrine of Necessity by the Supreme Court in 1978) the following initiatives were taken:
 Strict Islamic law was introduced into the country's legal system by 1978, contributing to current-day sectarianism and religious fundamentalism, as well as instilling a sense of religious purpose within the youth.
 Pakistan fought a war by proxy against the Communists in Afghanistan in the Soviet-Afghan War, greatly contributing to the eventual withdrawal of Soviet forces from Afghanistan.
 Secessionist uprisings in Balochistan were put down by the province's authoritarian martial law ruler, General Rahimuddin Khan, who ruled for an unprecedented seven years under martial law.
 The socialist economic policies of the previous civilian government, which also included aggressive nationalisation, were gradually reversed; and Pakistan's gross national product rose greatly.

General Zia lifted martial law in 1985, holding party-less elections and handpicking Muhammad Khan Junejo to be the Prime Minister of Pakistan, who in turn rubber-stamped Zia remaining Chief of Army Staff until 1990. Junejo, however gradually fell out with Zia as his political and administrative independence grew. Junejo also signed the Geneva Accord, which Zia greatly disliked. After a large-scale explosion at ammunitions store in Ojhri, Junejo vowed to bring those responsible for the significant damage caused to justice, implicating several times the Inter-Services Intelligence (ISI) Director-General Akhtar Abdur Rahman.

President Zia, infuriated, dismissed the Junejo government on several charges in May 1988. He then called for the holding of fresh elections in November. General Zia-ul-Haq never saw the elections materialize however, as he died in a plane crash on August 17, 1988, which was later proven to be highly sophisticated sabotage by unknown perpetrators.

Under Zia, real defence spending increased on average by 9 percent per annum during 1977–88 while development spending rose 3 percent per annum; by 1987–88 defence spending had overtaken development spending. For the 1980s as a whole, defence spending averaged 6.5 percent of GDP. This contributed strongly to large fiscal deficits and a rapid build-up of public debt.

References

External links 
 Maulana Ihtesham ul Haq Thanvi on History of Pakistani Politics - Part I
 Maulana Ihtesham ul Haq Thanvi on History of Pakistani Politics - Part II